Infinity is an abstract sculpture designed by José de Rivera and created by Roy Gussow. It is located at the south entrance of the National Museum of American History, at Madison Drive and 12th Street, Northwest, Washington, D.C.

It was dedicated on March 28, 1967. It cost $104,520. It slowly rotates on its base.

Rivera created a similar sister sculpture that was installed at Rochester Institute of Technology one year later.

See also
 List of public art in Washington, D.C., Ward 2

References

External links
"Measuring Infinity: José de Rivera's Smithsonian Sculpture on the National Mall", Curator, David Shayt, 15 January 2010
http://dcmemorials.com/index_indiv0000497.htm 
http://www.aaa.si.edu/collections/interviews/oral-history-interview-jos-de-rivera-12594

Modernist sculpture
1967 sculptures
Sculptures of the Smithsonian Institution
Abstract sculptures in Washington, D.C.
Outdoor sculptures in Washington, D.C.
Stainless steel sculptures
Steel sculptures in Washington, D.C.
National Mall